Sam by Starck was a  abstract statue by Philippe Starck in Las Vegas. The work was removed in 2019.

References

2019 disestablishments in Nevada
Abstract sculptures in the United States
Outdoor sculptures in Nevada